Chloracyzine is an antidepressant and coronary vasodilator of the phenothiazine class, invented in Russia and used as an anti-anginal agent. It was found not to have antipsychotic activity, but was instead the first Russian tricyclic drug with antidepressant action.

References

Amides
Chloroarenes
Phenothiazines
Russian drugs
Tertiary amines
Tricyclic antidepressants
Vasodilators